The Senior women's race at the 1980 IAAF World Cross Country Championships was held in Paris, France, at the Hippodrome de Longchamp on March 9, 1980.   A report on the event was given in the Evening Times.

Complete results, medallists, 
 and the results of British athletes were published.

Race results

Senior women's race (4.82 km)

Individual

Teams

Note: Athletes in parentheses did not score for the team result

Participation
An unofficial count yields the participation of 104 athletes from 20 countries in the Senior women's race.  This is in agreement with the official numbers as published.

 (3)
 (6)
 (5)
 (5)
 (6)
 (6)
 (6)
 (2)
 (6)
 (6)
 (5)
 (5)
 (5)
 (6)
 (6)
 (6)
 (3)
 (6)
 (6)
 (5)

See also
 1980 IAAF World Cross Country Championships – Senior men's race
 1980 IAAF World Cross Country Championships – Junior men's race

References

Senior women's race at the World Athletics Cross Country Championships
IAAF World Cross Country Championships
1980 in women's athletics